Adil Rhaili (born 25 April 1991) is a Moroccan professional footballer who plays as a defender.

Career

Apollon Smyrnis 

On 8 July 2021, Apollon Smyrnis announced the signing of a new contract with Rhaili, even though he had played only once in the previous season, as he got a serious injury in the first match that made him lose the rest of the season.

Career statistics

Club

Honours
Raja Casablanca
Botola (3): 2008–09, 2012–13

Milsami Orhei
Divizia Națională (1): 2014–15

References

External links

Profile at FC Milsami

1991 births
Living people
Moroccan footballers
Footballers from Rabat
Moroccan expatriate footballers
Raja CA players
FC Milsami Orhei players
AS FAR (football) players
Umm Salal SC players
Wydad AC players
Alki Larnaca FC players
Apollon Smyrnis F.C. players
Botola players
Kuwait SC players
Kuwait Premier League players
Moldovan Super Liga players
Qatar Stars League players
Association football defenders
Expatriate footballers in Moldova
Expatriate footballers in Kuwait
Expatriate footballers in Qatar
Expatriate footballers in Greece
Moroccan expatriate sportspeople in Moldova
Moroccan expatriate sportspeople in Kuwait
Moroccan expatriate sportspeople in Qatar
Moroccan expatriate sportspeople in Greece